The Renard R.36 was a Belgian all-metal fighter aircraft designed by Alfred Renard to replace the Fairey Firefly IIM within the Belgian Air Force. Designed to improve on the Renard Epervier, which was never adopted by the Belgian government, the prototype R.36 first flew on 5 November 1937. Following testing the R.36 was selected by the Belgian Air Force in late 1938, with 40 aircraft provisionally ordered, to be delivered in two years.

However, on 17 January 1939 the prototype, OO-ARW, crashed near Nivelles, killing pilot Lt. Viscount Eric de Spoelberch. The official investigation was inconclusive, no evidence of material failure being discovered, with the most probable causes being radio equipment coming loose during a high-G manoeuvre, jamming the controls, or the pilot becoming incapacitated.  The airframe had accumulated 75:30 hours' flight time. The order was then dropped in favour of licence production of the Hawker Hurricane by SABCA.

Variants

R.36 
Single-seat fighter powered by a  Hispano-Suiza 12Ycrs engine, one built. Planned armament was 4 × 7.7 mm FN Browning machine guns and 1 × 20 mm autocannon or 3 × 20 mm autocannons.

R.37 

Version of R.36 powered by a  Gnome-Rhône 14N-21 radial engine, one aircraft captured by German forces in May 1940. Planned armament was 4 × 7.7 mm FN Browning machine guns or 2 × 13.2 mm FN Browning shell firing guns. Technical documentation from the "Ateliers Renard" also mention the possibility of fitting the R.37 with a composite armament of 2 ×  13.2 mm FN Browning machine guns and 2 × 20 mm autocannons or with 6 × 7.7 mm  FN Browning machine guns.

R.38 
Derivative of R.36 aircraft powered by a  Rolls-Royce Merlin II. One built, which was first flown on 4 August 1939 reaching a speed of  during testing. Prototype evacuated to France but captured by German forces and scrapped. Planned armament was 4 × 7.7 mm FN Browning machine guns or 4 × 13.2 mm FN Browning shell firing guns. Technical documentation from the "Ateliers Renard" also planned the use of 4 × 20 mm autocannons.

R.40 
Former unfinished R.36 aircraft completed with a Merlin engine following French interest, not finished and components captured by German forces.

R.42 
Twin fuselage variant of the R.38, similar to the F-82 Twin Mustang. Proposed armament was four 13.2 mm FN Browning shell firing guns or four 20 mm autocannons. Existed only on paper.

Operators 

Belgian Air Force

Specifications (R.36)

See also

References

External links 

S.A.M. #31: The Belgian Alternative

R.36
1930s Belgian fighter aircraft
Low-wing aircraft
Single-engined tractor aircraft
Aircraft first flown in 1937